Matt Simon (born 1986) is an Australian former soccer player

Matt Simon may also refer to:
Matt Simon (American football, born 1953), American football coach and former player
Matt Simon (American football, born 1985), American football coach and former player

See also
Matt Simons (born 1987), American singer-songwriter
Matthew Simonds, a character in Honorverse